Hymenostegia is a genus of flowering plants in the family Fabaceae. They are native to Africa.

The genus is not well defined. Several species probably do not belong, and some have been moved to other genera.

Species
Species include:
Hymenostegia aubrevillei
Hymenostegia bakeriana
Hymenostegia felicis
Hymenostegia gracilipes
Hymenostegia pellegrinii
Hymenostegia talbotii
Hymenostegia viridiflora

References

Detarioideae
Fabaceae genera
Taxonomy articles created by Polbot